The Belfast–Derry line (referred to as the Derry~Londonderry Line by NI Railways) runs from Belfast to Derry in Northern Ireland. The line is double-track on the short section it shares with the Belfast–Larne line, but is composed primarily of single track from Monkstown to Derry with passing points at Templepatrick, Antrim, Magherabeg, Ballymena, Killagan, Ballymoney, Coleraine and Bellarena.

Current service

On Sundays services from Great Victoria Street to Derry operate every two hours from Derry to Belfast and vice versa. During those hours when trains do not depart from Derry, the shuttle service from Portrush to Coleraine continues on to Great Victoria Street. This means that only passengers departing from Derry,  and  have a two-hour wait between departing services.

The first train Monday to Saturday begins at Coleraine and weekends begins from Coleraine.

Previous operations
Before 2001, and the reopening of the Bleach Green viaduct, services operated via Crumlin, Glenavy, Ballinderry and Lisburn. The reopening of the Bleach Green viaduct resulted in shorter journeys between Belfast and Derry. A skeleton service continued on the Lisburn–Antrim line until 2003, when the line and its stations were closed. This section of railway is now used solely for driver training or other operational requirements e.g. special services to major events.

Upgrade and Future
In 2011, it was planned to reduce services on the Coleraine to Londonderry section to five services, in each direction on weekdays, to facilitate safety improvement works during refurbishment of the line  due to commence in 2012, but the £75 million that it was to cost was unavailable. This led to fears that the line would be permanently closed. Regional Development minister Danny Kennedy relocated funding from the A5 dualling project to the railway upgrade project, allowing for a 3-phase upgrade.

Phase 1 saw the line close for nine months to completely relay two sections (Coleraine to Castlerock; and Eglinton to Derry), extending the life of the remaining section by converting the jointed track to continuous welded rail, elimination of wet spots, and essential bridge repairs. This was completed by 2013, and timetable changes resulted in a morning train reaching Derry before 9 a.m. for the first time since Northern Ireland Railways took control of the network in the 1960s.

Phase 2 saw the passing loop removed and the 'down' track lifted at Castlerock, replaced with a new loop further down the line at Bellarena halt. New signalling was introduced, and the signal boxes at Castlerock and Waterside, Derry closed, with the line operating under absolute block. An hourly service between Belfast and Derry was introduced in 2017.

Phase 3 will include rail renewal between Castlerock and Eglinton, the introduction of a  line speed between Castlerock and Derry and other works, however funding for this part of the project is doubtful for the foreseeable future.

Other future plans for the Derry line include the reinstatement of the double line from Antrim to Ballymena, and the doubling of the track from Monkstown to Templepatrick. The route terminus in Derry was relocated in 2019 when the former Belfast and Northern Counties Railway Waterside station reopened, replacing the 1980 terminus.

Railway engineering feature
Coleraine has a bascule bridge for the railway over the navigable River Bann. Just after Castlerock station there are two tunnels created during an event known as the Great Blast in October 1845.

Signalling
Signalling on the line from Great Victoria Street to Slaught level crossing (just south of Ballymena station) is controlled by the Belfast Central control terminal. From Kellswater South, the signalling and level crossings are controlled by the Coleraine signal cabin. The signal boxes at Castlerock and Waterside, which previously controlled the token system, have now been closed. The whole of the Belfast to Derry line is now controlled by colour light signals, the last semaphore signals at Castlerock station being removed after the 2016 signalling upgrade. The signal box at Coleraine will be moved to Lanyon Place upon completion of the Belfast Hub project.

Rolling stock
Following the complete withdrawal of the NIR Class 80 and NIR Class 450 trains, the line is now served by a combination of NIR Class 3000 and NIR Class 4000 diesel multiple units.

References

External links 

 Translink Timetables

Railway lines in Northern Ireland
Transport in Belfast
Transport in County Antrim
Transport in County Londonderry
Northern Ireland coast and countryside
Tourist attractions in Northern Ireland
5 ft 3 in gauge railways